Michael Joseph Hicks (1 August 19377 September 2017) was a British politician, executive member of printers’ union SOGAT, and general secretary of the Communist Party of Britain.

Career
Hicks joined the Young Communist League in 1953 and later the Communist Party of Great Britain. He worked as a printer and was a member of the Society of Graphical and Allied Trades (SOGAT). A full-time branch official for the union in 1986, Hicks was arrested and convicted of actual bodily harm during the Wapping dispute. His conviction and sentencing to 12 months in prison were controversial, with the national executive committee of the Labour Party voting unanimously to call for his release. He was expelled from the CPGB in 1984 "for allowing Rule 3(d) to be applied" as the chair of the London District Congress, i.e. continuing with the congress proceedings in defiance of a demand from CPGB General Secretary Gordon McLennan to close it down.

Hicks served as its general secretary until his replacement by Robert Griffiths in 1998, which led to an industrial dispute at the Morning Star and subsequently left the party and helped to form the Marxist Forum group. He served as the trade union officer of the London-based Marx Memorial Library from 2005 to 2010. He joined the Labour Party, and unsuccessfully stood as a council election candidate in the Boscombe East ward of Bournemouth on 5 May 2011, gaining 514 votes.

Death
Hicks died at age 80 on the evening of 7 September 2017 after collapsing while accepting the position of Honorary President of Bournemouth Labour Party at its annual general meeting.

References

1937 births
2017 deaths
Communist Party of Great Britain members
Communist Party of Britain members
British trade unionists
British Marxists
English communists
British communists
Trade union officials convicted of crimes
Leaders of political parties in the United Kingdom
British political party founders